Shaun Muir Racing (or SMR) is an international race team based in Guisborough, Cleveland in the north-east of England. The team is owned by Shaun Muir, a former international superbike racer. In 2019, they became the BMW works team using BMW S1000RR machines.

They were the 2011 British Superbike Championship winning team with rider Tommy Hill, and again in 2015 with rider Josh Brookes.

Shaun Muir Racing began in 2002, moving into the British Superbike Championship in 2004 under the Hydrex Honda banner, staying with Honda until 2011 when they switched to Yamaha machinery going on to win their first title. From 2013 to 2015, the team used the name Milwaukee Yamaha, reflecting the name of its major sponsor, Milwaukee Tools.

During 2015, SMR acted as a Yamaha factory development agent, working to develop the cross-plane R1 engined machines in advance of an anticipated return to World Superbike racing in 2016.

In an online interview in November 2015, rider Josh Brookes commented that Muir could not make a statement regarding the team's plans for 2016 until the contract with Yamaha had ended in December. In early December, Shaun Muir confirmed  his move to BMW S1000RR machinery and World Superbikes.

World Superbikes 2016 season

For 2016, Shaun Muir Racing confirmed a new arrangement with BMW factory motorsport to participate in World Superbikes, initially via a one-year contract with a second-year option, as a semi-factory supported team, again backed by key-sponsor Milwaukee Tools for three years. Muir further confirmed his disappointment that Yamaha had not responded as expected with an offer of machinery for 2016 World Superbikes as far back as June/July 2015, and that he anticipated better interaction with the BMW factory. The 2015 BSB champion rider Josh Brookes will be retained, joined by Czech rider Karel Abraham.

British Superbikes 2015 season

During 2015, SMR acted as a Yamaha factory development agent in conjunction with Yamaha Europe and their German research and development base, using the British Superbike season to progress the machines in advance of an anticipated return to World Superbike racing in 2016. The alliance provided the team with the latest engine improvements, with manager Mick Shanley making regular trips to the base of engine tuner Marcus Eschenbacher.

For 2015, the team logo was uniquely changed from the previous version, by adding the official Yamaha crossed tuning-fork logo, together with the additional legend "Official Team BSB".

British Superbikes 2013-2014 season

During the 2013 and 2014 seasons, SMR worked with major sponsor Milwaukee Tools and race-modified Yamaha R1 machines purchased over-the-counter. The team logo for 2013 and 2014 was historically significant, using the name Milwaukee Yamaha Racing, until changes were made for the 2015 season by adding the official Yamaha tuning-fork logo with added legend unique for 2015, changing the appearance to Milwaukee Yamaha Racing, Official Team BSB.

Riders present and past

As BMW Motorrad
2023Scott ReddingMichael van der Mark
2022Scott ReddingMichael van der Mark
Illia Mykhalchyk (some races, replacement for van der Mark)
2021Tom SykesMichael van der Mark
Eugene Laverty (some races, replacement for Sykes)
2020Tom SykesEugene Laverty
2019Tom SykesMarkus Reiterberger

As Milwaukee Aprilia
2018Davide Giugliano (some races)Eugene Laverty (some races, injured)Lorenzo Savadori (some races)

2017Eugene Laverty (all races)Lorenzo SavadoriJulián Simón

As Milwaukee BMW
2016Josh BrookesKarel Abraham

As Milwaukee Yamaha
2015Josh Brookes #25
Broc Parkes #2 (first part of season)
Jakub Smrž #96 (selected races, end of season)

2014
Josh Brookes #3
Tommy Bridewell #46
Ian Hutchinson

2013
James Ellison #77
Josh Waters #21 (replaced by Tommy Bridewell for last three rounds)

Past

As Hydrex Honda
Kieran Clarke #74 (2005)
Steve Plater #4 (2005)
Gary Mason #5 (2006)
Glen Richards #75 (2006)
Dean Thomas #12 (Replacement for Mason 2006)
Stuart Easton #3 (2009)
Karl Harris #5 (2009)
Tommy Hill #33 (Replacement for Harris 2009)
Guy Martin #9

As Bike Animal Honda
Leon Camier #2 (2007)
Ian Hutchinson #2 (Replacement for Camier 2007)
James Ellison #7 (2008)
Guy Martin #15 (2008)

As Swan Honda
James Ellison #2 (2010)
Stuart Easton #3 (2010)

As Swan Yamaha
Michael Laverty #7 (2011)

Tommy Hill #33/#1 (2011/2012)

Noriyuki Haga #41 (2012)

Road Racing 
Guy Martin, William Dunlop, and Conor Cummins have represented the team on the roads at North West 200, Isle of Man TT, Macau Grand Prix, Kells and Isle of Man Southern 100 on the Superbike, Supersport and Superstock machines.

British Superbike Championship 

After the departure of James Ellison in 2008 to GSE racing Airwaves Yamaha Team, Karl Harris was taken on to race alongside Stuart Easton to compete for the BSB championship in 2009.

Easton finished third place in the Championship, whilst Harris was dropped due to poor performances, his place being taken for the last three rounds by Tommy Hill.

Superbike World Championship

Results
(key) (Races in bold indicate pole position; races in italics indicate fastest lap)

* Season still in progress.

References

External links 
 Hydrex Honda at Motor Cycle News

Motorcycle racing teams
Companies based in Redcar and Cleveland
Motorcycle racing teams established in 2002
2002 establishments in the United Kingdom